Edward Daniel DiPrete (born July 8, 1934) is an American Republican Party politician and convicted felon from Rhode Island. He served as the 70th Governor of Rhode Island for three two-year terms, serving from 1985 to 1991. Convicted of numerous corruption charges, he is the only Rhode Island governor to have gone to prison.

Early life
DiPrete was born in Cranston, Rhode Island. He graduated from the College of the Holy Cross, and received honorary degrees from Holy Cross, Providence College, Bryant College and the University of Rhode Island. From 1970 to 1974, he served on the Cranston School Committee. From 1974 to 1978, he served as an at-large member of the Cranston City Council. He served as mayor of the city from 1978 to 1985.

Governor of Rhode Island
DiPrete served as the 70th Governor of Rhode Island from 1985 to 1991, and was defeated for reelection in a landslide by former U.S. government attorney and millionaire businessman Bruce Sundlun in the 1990 election, who had previously lost twice to DiPrete.

In 1994, DiPrete was indicted on criminal charges relating to the awarding of state contracts during his service as governor. All charges were dismissed in March 1997 by a Rhode Island Superior Court Judge who also found the State Attorney General's office guilty of 10 findings of "egregious prosecutorial misconduct."

He was subsequently charged again, and in December 1998, he pleaded guilty to state charges of bribery, extortion and racketeering, and was sentenced to a year in prison.

In a plea bargain he also admitted accepting $250,000 in exchange for state contracts during his term as governor. DiPrete agreed to this plea bargain only after receiving assurance that pending charges against one of his sons would be dismissed.  Those charges against his son were dismissed in their entirety prior to DiPrete agreeing to the plea bargain. In addition, his state retirement pension was revoked, despite attempts to have it reinstated. DiPrete served eleven months in Adult Correctional Institutions.

Subsequently, the state Supreme Court overturned the denial of DiPrete's pension benefits to his wife and remanded the case back to Superior Court for a new hearing. Because of a degenerative neurological disease, Mrs. DiPrete, notified the court through her attorney, she wished to terminate the request, and the new hearing ordered by the Supreme Court did not proceed.

Personal life
DiPrete was known for his "everyman" persona, serving supermarket fried chicken to guests in his Winnebago motor home. He parked the motor home outside the Rhode Island State House during a snowstorm in February 1987 so that he would be able to come to work despite heavy snowfall. DiPrete kept an arcade Pac-Man game in his house, which he demonstrated to president George H. W. Bush in 1989.

DiPrete and his wife Patricia had seven children; Patricia died in 2011. DiPrete lived in his home in Cranston until October 2016, when he moved to an apartment in the Garden City section of that city.

Electoral history

References

 

|-

|-

1934 births
20th-century American politicians
American politicians convicted of bribery
College of the Holy Cross alumni
Living people
Mayors of Cranston, Rhode Island
Politicians convicted of racketeering
Republican Party governors of Rhode Island
Rhode Island city council members
Rhode Island politicians convicted of crimes
School board members in Rhode Island